Pudu LRT station is an elevated rapid transit station situated in Pudu, Kuala Lumpur, Malaysia. The station serves a single line that is shared by both the Ampang Line and Sri Petaling Line. The station was opened on 16 December 1996, as part of the first phase of the STAR LRT system's opening, alongside 13 adjoining stations along the Sultan Ismail-Ampang route.

Location

The Pudu station is located on the western fringe of the incorporated town of Pudu, along Jalan Sarawak, an alleyway northeast from the station, behind of a row of shophouses afront Jalan Pudu, a main thoroughfare in Pudu. The station is also accessible via Jalan San Peng from the southwest and Jalan Sungai Besi from the southeast.

As parts of the Ampang Line route reused the now defunct Federated Malay States Railways (FMSR) and Malayan Railways (KTM) line between Kuala Lumpur, Ampang and Salak Selatan, the Pudu station serves as an unofficial replacement of an older Pudoh station that was formerly located in roughly the same location, closed in 1993 and demolished outright during the 1990s as the STAR line was constructed in place of the railway tracks. The station is one of three Ampang Line and Sri Petaling stations serving the Pudu area, the other being the Hang Tuah station and Chan Sow Lin station.

Design

While the original KTM railway line that the Ampang Line route was based on was laid out on street level, the immediate line adjoining the STAR's Pudu station and the station itself are elevated. A reason for this was the proximity of a former level crossing at Jalan Sungai Besi, southeast from the station. The density of the area meant that an elevated railway line was more feasible than a road bridge or railway bridge in order to bypass road traffic and avoid unnecessary stoppages for road users. The tracks follow the route of the old railway line.

The station was designed in a two-tier layout, with a raised ticketing and staff rooms on the lower floor, and the two side platforms and tracks on the top floor. Both platforms converge at the ticket area via stairways and escalators. No elevators are provided. The principal styling of the station is like most other stations in the line, featuring multi-tiered roofs supported by latticed frames, and white plastered walls and pillars.

In popular culture
The Pudu station was featured by name in the 1999 film Entrapment starring Sean Connery and Catherine Zeta-Jones. Although the Bukit Jalil LRT station was actually used as the filming location, the sign there showed Pudu instead of Bukit Jalil (though on the same line).

References 

Ampang Line
Railway stations opened in 1996
1996 establishments in Malaysia